This article contains a list of Wikipedia articles about politicians in countries outside Vietnam who are of Vietnamese origin.

Australia
 Dai Le – Member of Parliament in the House of Representatives
 Phuong Ngo – Deputy Mayor of Fairfield and convicted murderer of New South Wales State MP John Newman
 Tung Ngo – Member of the South Australian Legislative Council
 Sang Nguyen – Member of the Victorian Legislative Council
 Batong Pham – Member of the Western Australian Legislative Council
 Huong Truong – Member of the Victorian Legislative Council

Canada
 Wayne Cao – Member of the Legislative Assembly of Alberta 
 Hoang Mai – Shadow Minister of National Revenue (2011-2013)
 Thanh Hai Ngo – Senator from Ontario
 Hung Pham – Member of the Legislative Assembly of Alberta 
 Anne Minh-Thu Quach – Member of Parliament in the House of Commons of Canada
 Ève-Mary Thaï Thi Lac – Member of Parliament 
 Kevin Vuong – Member of Parliament

France
 Stéphanie Do – Member of the National Assembly
 Olivier Faure – First Secretary of the Socialist Party
 Liêm Hoang-Ngoc – Member of the European Parliament
 Margie Sudre – President of the Regional Council of Réunion (1993-1998)

Laos
 Kaysone Phomvihane – Born Nguyễn Cai Song; 1st General Secretary of the Central Committee of the Lao People's Revolutionary Party (1955-1992), 2nd President of Laos (1991-1992) and 11th Prime Minister of Laos (1975-1991)

Solomon Islands
 Namson Tran – Deputy Speaker of the National Parliament of Solomon Islands (2010-2011)

United States

US Congress
 Joseph Cao – Representative from Louisiana
 Stephanie Murphy – Representative from Florida

State and territory levels
 Jerome Cochran – Member of the Tennessee House of Representatives
 Tyler Diep – Member of the California State Assembly
 Bao Nguyen – Mayor of Garden Grove, California
 Bee Nguyen – Member of the Georgia House of Representatives
 Janet Nguyen – Member of the California State Assembly
 Joe Nguyen – Member of the Washington Senate
 Madison Nguyen – Vice Mayor of San Jose, California
 Quang Nguyen – Member of the Arizona House of Representatives
 Rochelle Nguyen – Member of the Nevada Assembly
 Tram Nguyen – Member of the Massachusetts House of Representatives
 Buu Nygren –President-elect of the Navajo Nation
 Khanh Pham – Member of the Oregon House of Representatives
 Tri Ta – Member of the California State Assembly
 My-Linh Thai – Member of the Washington House of Representatives
 Dean Tran – Massachusetts Senate Assistant Minority Whip
 Helen Tran – Mayor-elect of San Bernardino, California
 Kathy Tran – Member of the Virginia House of Delegates
 Van Tran – Member of the California State Assembly
 Hubert Vo – Member of the Texas House of Representatives

See also 
 List of heads of state and government of Indian origin
 List of foreign politicians of Chinese origin
 List of foreign politicians of Indian origin
 List of foreign politicians of Japanese origin
 List of foreign politicians of Korean origin
 List of foreign politicians of Iranian origin

References 

Politicians of Vietnamese descent
Lists of politicians